Magda Hellinger was a Jewish woman. During World War II as a prisoner in a leadership role in Auschwitz-Birkenau, she saved dozens of women from certain death.

Hellinger was born in eastern Czechoslovakia to a father who taught Jewish history and German.  He imparted his skills in German on his daughter, which she would put to use in Auschwitz. Interested in Zionism from an early age, she joined a Zionist youth organization, and worked as a kindergarten teacher.

Hellinger died in 2006 at age 89 a few years after she had self-published her memoir and had given testimony, which was taped on a few occasions. After her death, her daughter Maya Lee (with the help of a co-writer, David Brewster) added to that memoir after doing more research. She published The Nazis Knew My Name in 2022.

Bibliography
Magda Hellinger, Maya Lee, and David Brewster. The Nazis Knew My Name: A Remarkable Story of Survival and Courage in Auschwitz. Atria, 2022. ISBN 9781982181239.

References

Auschwitz concentration camp prisoners